Quy railway station served the parish of Stow cum Quy, Cambridgeshire, England from 1884 to 1964 on the Cambridge to Mildenhall railway.

History 
The station opened on 2 June 1884 by the Great Eastern Railway. It was situated along a road that ran northwest of Station Road. The station had a small goods shed that had a siding that went to behind the west end of the platform. In June 1935 the station was downgraded to an unstaffed halt and the signal box was demolished. It later closed to passengers on 18 June 1962 and to goods on 13 July 1964.

References

External links 

Disused railway stations in Cambridgeshire
Former Great Eastern Railway stations
Railway stations in Great Britain opened in 1884
Railway stations in Great Britain closed in 1962
1884 establishments in England
1964 disestablishments in England